Grace Wong Kit-cheng  is currently a member of the Legislative Assembly of Macau Special Administrative Region.、Deputy head nurse  of Kiang Wu Hospital、vice chairman of Associação Geral das Mulheres de Macau、President of Associação da Construcao Conjunta de Um Bom La.

She has been working as a nurse since 2012，and won direct elections in the 2013 Macanese legislative election. In 2017, she formed the "Beautiful Home Alliance" to run for 2017 Macanese legislative election，and was successfully re-elected with 9,496 votes. Wong Kit-cheng pays special attention to women's rights, family development, children's growth and medical treatment. Also concerned about people's livelihood issues, such as housing, prices, transportation and so on. In 2021, he will once again run for the 2021 Macanese legislative election with the "Better Home Alliance", and was successfully re-elected with 14,232 votes.

References 

Living people
Members of the Legislative Assembly of Macau
Macau women in politics
Alumni of the Hong Kong Polytechnic University
21st-century women politicians
Year of birth missing (living people)